Pachhad Assembly constituency is one of the 68 constituencies in the Himachal Pradesh Legislative Assembly of Himachal Pradesh a northern state of India. It is also part of Shimla Lok Sabha constituency.

Members of Legislative Assembly

Election candidates

2022

Election results

2019 by-election

See also
 Sirmaur district
 List of constituencies of Himachal Pradesh Legislative Assembly

References

External links
 

Assembly constituencies of Himachal Pradesh
Sirmaur district